Mina Hodzic (born 6 June 2002) is a German tennis player.

Hodzic has a career high WTA singles ranking of 497 achieved on 13 June 2022.

Hodzic won her first major ITF title at the 2022 Engie Open de Biarritz.

ITF finals

Singles : 2 (2 titles)

References

External links

2002 births
Living people
German female tennis players
21st-century German women